Jeff Howe (born June 15, 1959) is an American politician and member of the Minnesota Senate. A member of the Republican Party of Minnesota, he represents District 13 in central Minnesota. He is a former member of the Minnesota House of Representatives, representing District 13A.

Early life, education, and career
Howe grew up on a farm near Chokio, Minnesota, and graduated from Chokio-Alberta High School. He attended St. Cloud State University, graduating with a Bachelor of Arts.

Howe was a member of the United States Armed Forces for 38 years, first in the Navy and later in the Minnesota Army National Guard. He retired in 2017 with the rank of lieutenant colonel. He was a member of the Rockville city council and is now a consultant.

Minnesota Legislature
Howe was first elected to the Minnesota House of Representatives in 2012. He did not seek reelection in 2018 in order to seek election to the Minnesota Senate, which he won.

Personal life
Howe is married to Sheri Howe. They have four children and reside in Rockville, Minnesota. His brother John Howe is a former Minnesota state senator.

References

External links

Official Senate website
Official campaign website

1959 births
Living people
People from Stearns County, Minnesota
St. Cloud State University alumni
Republican Party members of the Minnesota House of Representatives
21st-century American politicians
Republican Party Minnesota state senators